The WARS Roleplaying Game is a role-playing game published by Mongoose Publishing in 2005.

Description
The WARS Roleplaying Game is a d20 System game based on the WARS Trading Card Game.

Publication history
The WARS Roleplaying Game was published by Mongoose Publishing in 2005.

Reception

References

British role-playing games
Mongoose Publishing games
Role-playing games based on works
Role-playing games introduced in 2005
Science fiction role-playing games